József baron Eötvös de Vásárosnamény (pronunciation: ['jɔ:ʒef 'øtvøʃ dɛ  'va:ʃa:rɔʃnɒme:ɲ]; 3 September 1813 – 2 February 1871) was a Hungarian writer and statesman, the son of Ignác baron Eötvös de Vásárosnamény and Anna von Lilien, who stemmed from an Erbsälzer family of Werl in Germany. Eötvös name is sometimes anglicised as Joseph von Eotvos.

Biography
The Baron József Eötvös de Vásárosnamény was born in the Hungarian aristocratic family Eötvös de Vásárosnamény. His father was the Baron Ignác Eötvös de Vásárosnamény (1786–1851), lord of the bedchamber, vice-chancellor of the Kingdom of Hungary, and his mother was the Baroness Anne von der Lilien (1786–1858).

He received an excellent education and also spent many years in western Europe, assimilating the new ideas both literary and political, and making the acquaintance of the leaders of the Romantic school. On his return to Hungary he wrote his first political work, Prison Reform; and at the diet of 1839–1840 he made a great impression by his eloquence and learning. One of his first speeches (published, with additional matter, in 1841) warmly advocated Jewish emancipation. On 13 September 1842 he married the noble lady Ágnes Rosty de Barkóc (1825–1913), member of the illustrious noble family Rosty de Barkóc that originally hailed from the Vas county, daughter of Albert Rosty de Barkóc (1779–1847), jurist, landowner, vice-ispán of the county of Békés (alispán of Békés). Baron Eötvös' brother in law was Pál Rosty de Barkóc (1830–1874), a Hungarian nobleman, photographer, explorer, who visited Texas, New Mexico, Mexico, Cuba and Venezuela between 1857 and 1859. His other brother in law through his wife was dr. Ágoston Trefort (1817–1888) was a Hungarian politician, who served as Minister of Religion and Education, as he married the other Rosty sister, Ilona Rosty de Barkóc (1826–1870).

Eötvös disseminated his progressive ideas in the columns of the Pesti Hírlap, as well as in his novels The Village Notary (1844–1846) – one of the classics of Hungarian literature – Hungary in 1514, and the comedy Long live Equality!. The February Hungarian Revolution of 1848 was the complete triumph of Eötvös's ideas, and he held the portfolio of public worship and instruction in the first Hungarian ministry. Eötvös, Ferenc Deák and István Széchenyi represented the pacific, moderating influence in the council of ministers, but when the premier, Lajos Batthyány, resigned, Eötvös retired for a time to Munich during the War of Independence. Yet he continued to serve the cause in his influential writings, for example Influence of the Ruling Ideas of the 19th century on the State (Pest, 1851–1854, German editions at Vienna and Leipzig the same year).

On his return home, in 1851, he abstained from all political movements. In 1859 he published The Guarantees of the Power and Unity of Austria (the German edition was published in Leipzig the same year), in which he tried to arrive at a compromise between personal union and ministerial responsibility on the one hand and centralization on the other. After the Italian war, however, such a position was regarded as inadequate by the majority of the nation. In the diets of 1861, 1865, and 1867 Eötvös was one of the most loyal followers of Deák, with whose policy he now completely associated himself. On the formation of the Andrássy cabinet in February 1867 he once more accepted the portfolio of public worship and education, being the only one of the ministers of 1848 who thus returned to office. He had now, at last, the opportunity of realizing the ideals of a lifetime. That very year the diet passed his bill for the emancipation of the Jews; though his further efforts in the direction of religious liberty were less successful, owing to the opposition of the Catholics. Perhaps his greatest achievement was the National Schools Act, the most complete system of education provided for Hungary since the days of Maria Theresa. In 1866, he was elected president of the Hungarian academy. He died at Pest on 2 February 1871. On 3 May 1879 a statue was erected to him at Pest in the square which bears his name.

Eötvös occupies a prominent place in Hungarian literature. The best of his verses are to be found in his ballads, but he is better known for his novels. When he published The Carthusians, written on the occasion of the floods at Pest in 1838, the Hungarian novel was still in its infancy, being chiefly represented by the historico-epics of Jsikh. Eötvös first modernized it, giving prominence in his pages to current social problems and political aspirations. The famous Village Notary came still nearer to actual life, while Hungary in 1514 is especially interesting because it attributes the great national catastrophe of the Battle of Mohács to the blind selfishness of the Hungarian nobility and the intense sufferings of the people under them. The best edition of Eötvös collected works is that of 1891, in 17 volumes. Comparatively few of his writings have been translated, but there is a good English version (London, 1850) and numerous German versions of The Village Notary, while The Emancipation of the Jews has been translated into Italian and German (Pest, 1841– 1842), and a German translation of Hungary in 1514, under the title of Der Bauernkrieg in Ungarn was published at Pest in 1850.

Family
 Loránd Eötvös
 Actor and playwright Leo Ditrichstein was a grandson. Eotvos's name is sometimes spelled Joseph von Etooes.

References 

Attribution
 ; Endnotes:
 A. Ban, Life and Art of Baron Joseph Eotvos (Hung.) (Budapest, 1902);
 Zoltan Ferenczi Baron Joseph Eotvos (Hung.) (Budapest, 1903), the best biography
 M. Berkovics, Baron Joseph Eotvos and the French Literature'' (Hung.) (Budapest, 1904)

External links
 
 
 

1813 births
1871 deaths
People from Buda
Hungarian writers
Hungarian nobility
Education ministers of Hungary
Members of the Hungarian Academy of Sciences